Khandur is a village located in the Ludhiana West tehsil, of Ludhiana district, Punjab.

Administration
The village is administrated by a Sarpanch who is an elected representative of village as per constitution of India and Panchayati raj (India).
Sardar Roop Singh Deol has served as sarpanch for 10 years in the past. Bachitar Singh , Mintu Sarpanch are some other sarpanchs of the past. Current Sarpanch of the village is S. Jasvir Singh Deol

Villages in Ludhiana West Tehsil

Air travel connectivity 
The closest airport to the village is Sahnewal Airport.

References

Villages in Ludhiana West tehsil